Camille McMullen (born 1970/1971) is an American state court judge who serves as a judge of the Tennessee Court of Criminal Appeals.

Education 
McMullen earned her Bachelor of Science in Political Science at Austin Peay State University in 1993 and her Juris Doctor from the University of Tennessee in 1996. McMullen was a law clerk for Joe G. Riley, Tennessee Court of Criminal Appeals from 1996 to 1997.

Career 
McMullen worked for the Tennessee Valley Authority in 1994, a Legislative Assistant for the Republic of South Africa Parliament, Cape Town, South Africa in 1995, the Assistant District Attorney General for the Shelby County District Attorney General's Office from 1997 to 2001 and was the United States Attorney's Office for the Western District of Tennessee, Assistant United States Attorney from 2001 to 2008.

In 2008, McMullen was appointed by Democratic Governor Phil Bredesen to be a judge on the Court of Criminal Appeals on June 9, 2008, becoming the first African American woman to serve on an intermediate court in Tennessee.

On November 17, 2021, President Joe Biden announced his intent to nominate Andre Mathis to serve as a United States circuit judge of the United States Court of Appeals for the Sixth Circuit. On January 12, 2022, a hearing on his nomination was held before the Senate Judiciary Committee. Senator Marsha Blackburn complained that she and fellow Senator Bill Hagerty were not adequately consulted and both had recommended Camille McMullen as an alternative pick.

Personal life
McMullen is married to Bruce McMullen and they have two children. In 2002, McMullen received recognition for her work in Project Neighborhood.

See also 
 List of African-American jurists

References

Living people
Austin Peay State University alumni
University of Tennessee alumni
African-American judges
20th-century African-American women
21st-century African-American women
Year of birth uncertain